Astrakhan Oblast is a southern region of Russia with a rich musical history.  Modern institutions include the New Musical Theatre, Astrakhan Conservatory and the Astrakhan Regional Philharmonic.

Astrakhan